Hernán Figueroa Bueg (26 August 1927 – September 2013) was a decathlete from Chile. He won the gold medal in the men's decathlon event at the inaugural Pan American Games in 1951. He is a two-time Olympian (1948 and 1952) for his native South American country. In the mid-1970s, he is credited with instigating development of the sport's division of Masters athletics, encouraging the formation of organizations across South America.

References

External links
 

1927 births
2013 deaths
Chilean decathletes
Athletes (track and field) at the 1948 Summer Olympics
Athletes (track and field) at the 1951 Pan American Games
Athletes (track and field) at the 1952 Summer Olympics
Athletes (track and field) at the 1955 Pan American Games
Olympic athletes of Chile
Pan American Games medalists in athletics (track and field)
Pan American Games gold medalists for Chile
Pan American Games bronze medalists for Chile
Medalists at the 1951 Pan American Games
Medalists at the 1955 Pan American Games